IPSC Malaysia is the Malaysian association for practical shooting under the International Practical Shooting Confederation.

References 

Regions of the International Practical Shooting Confederation
Sports governing bodies in Malaysia
Shooting sports in Malaysia